Five ships of the Royal Navy have been named HMS Exeter after the city of Exeter in Devon.

 was a 70-gun third rate launched in 1680. She was damaged in an explosion in 1691 and was hulked. She was broken up in 1717.
 was a 60-gun fourth rate launched in 1697. She was rebuilt to carry 58 guns in 1744 and was broken up in 1763.
 was a 64-gun third rate launched in 1763. She was burned as unseaworthy in 1784.
 was a  heavy cruiser launched in 1929. She fought at the River Plate in 1939, and was sunk during the Second Battle of the Java Sea on 1 March 1942.
HMS Exeter was planned as a Type 61 frigate. She was ordered in 1956, but cancelled in 1957.
 was a Type 42 destroyer, launched in 1979. She served in the Falklands War and the Gulf War, and was in service until she was decommissioned on 27 May 2009.

Battle honours
 Sadras, 1782
 Providien, 1782
 Negapatam, 1782
 Trincomalee, 1782
 River Plate, 1939
 Malaya, 1942
 Sunda Strait, 1942
 Falklands, 1982
 Kuwait, 1991

Royal Navy ship names